This article is a comparison of the Benelux countries.

Geography

Politics

Government

International organisation membership

a Luxembourg, Netherlands and Belgium were among the founders of the predecessor of the OECD, the OEEC, in 1948

Economy
Source:

Demographics

Telecommunication

See also

Comparison of the Baltic states
Comparison of the Nordic countries

References

Benelux